The J.D.C. Bradley House, also known as Oakcrest, is a historic mansion at 5 Sadie Hutt Lane in Southborough, Massachusetts.  Built in 1913, the massive,  stucco house is one of the finest surviving works of architect Charles Adams Platt in Massachusetts.  The house was listed on the National Register of Historic Places in 1999, where it is listed at 60 Sears Road.

Description and history
The J.D.C. Bradley House is located in northern Southborough, at the center of the loop created by Sadie Hutt Lane. It is set at the crest of a rise, which affords views to the west. The house is a -story structure, with a wooden frame and exterior brick walls finished in stucco. Each section is topped by a hipped roof; the central block has three gable dormers projecting from the front facade. The interior retains most of its original finishes, and includes a library room  in size, sufficient to house 4,000 volumes.

The house was built in 1913 for James Donald Cameron Bradley, as a gift for his bride-to-be Helen Sears from her mother, Sarah Choate Sears.  The house, intended as a country estate, was designed by Charles Adams Platt, who was then at the pinnacle of his career.  It was built not far from the c. 1897 summer house of the Searses, now at 1 Sears Road.  It remained in the Bradley family until 1972, when it was sold to the Southborough School for Girls.  The school adapted it for its uses, but only occupied it for a few years.  In 1984, the estate was sold to developers, who subdivided the land surrounding the house for residential development.

See also
National Register of Historic Places listings in Worcester County, Massachusetts

References

Houses in Worcester County, Massachusetts
Buildings and structures in Southborough, Massachusetts
Houses on the National Register of Historic Places in Worcester County, Massachusetts